Treaty of Berwick may refer to:
Treaty of Berwick (1357), a treaty between Edward III of England and David II of Scotland for David's release
Treaty of Berwick (1526), a treaty between the Earl of Angus and England
Treaty of Berwick (1560), a treaty between the Duc du Chatelherault  and Queen Elizabeth I to expel the French from Scotland
Treaty of Berwick (1586), a mutual defence agreement between Queen Elizabeth I of England and King James VI of Scotland
Treaty of Berwick (1639), a treaty between England and Scotland ending the First Bishops' War